The Battle of Jiksan (직산 전투) was a military conflict fought between Ming and Japanese forces on 16 October 1597. It resulted in withdrawal by both sides. However the battle marked the furthest point the Japanese ever got to reaching Hanseong during the Second Invasion.

Background

Ma Gui led Niu Boying and Jie Sheng to Jiksan, modern Cheonan, and laid an ambush there for the Japanese army.

Battle
On 16 October 1597, Kuroda Nagamasa's force of 5,000 arrived at Jiksan, where 6,000 Ming soldiers were stationed. Kuroda's forces charged the enemies and was soon joined by the rest of the army, bringing Japanese forces to 30,000. Although heavily outnumbering the Ming, the Japanese were unable to do much damage due to the Ming's superior armor. According to Kuroda and Mōri Hidemoto, their firearms could not penetrate the iron shields used by Chinese soldiers, and their armor was at least partially bulletproof. The battle continued until dusk when the two sides withdrew. It is disputed as to whether the Ming or Japanese army withdrew first, and consequently which side won the battle.

Kuroda launched another attack at night, this time in a pronged sweeping crane formation that sought to crush the enemies between them. The attack failed and turned into a rout that was joined by 2,000 Ming cavalry.

Aftermath and implication
Jiksan was the furthest the Japanese ever got towards reaching Hanseong during the second invasion. Although they were forced to withdraw at Jiksan, it was not a major loss, and resulted in an orderly retreat south by the Japanese.

References

Bibliography

 
 
 
 
 
 
 
 
 
 
 桑田忠親 [Kuwata, Tadachika], ed., 舊參謀本部編纂, [Kyu Sanbo Honbu], 朝鮮の役 [Chousen no Eki]　(日本の戰史 [Nihon no Senshi] Vol. 5), 1965.

References
Annals of Seonjo
Chapter 259 history of the Ming
Kuroda Kafu

Jiksan
1597 in Asia